The Boy and the Pope is a 1987 Colombian film that tells the story of a nine-year-old Mexican boy named Angel who wants to meet the Pope after he is a victim of the 1985 Mexico City earthquake.

The film was directed by Rodrigo Castaño and features Christopher Lago and Verónica Castro in the leading roles. In 1987 it was released after Pope John Paul II's visit to Colombia.

Plot
In a humble Mexico City neighborhood, a small boy named Angel lives with his mother, who is a homemaker and works as a seamstress. She really dreams that her son will study and someday receive a bachelor's degree. When Angel is at school, a strong earthquake strikes the city leaving thousands of people injured (or worse), including Angel and his mother.

Angel was desperate to find his mother alive, he decides to walk a few steps until arriving at the Basilica of our Lady of Guadalupe, with the intention of praying for his missing mother. At the same time, Alicia, his mother, is helped by Carlos, a hospital doctor. As the boy leaves the church, he sees a large statue of Pope John Paul II, and a priest tells him that the next visit of saint father will be to Colombia.

An hour later, he went forward onto the registration of missing people, and he realized that his mother's name would not appear among those found persons and he should be sent to an orphanage. Hearing this, he decides to flee until coming curiously to the airport, where he thinks it would be a good idea to take the next flight bound to Colombia with the aim of meeting the Pope.

Arriving in Colombia, some flight attendants find him hidden in a bathroom of the plane and hand him over to a woman to take charge, but suddenly the boy escapes.  The next day, Angel went to a food stand and he is seen by Carmen, who works as a saleswoman at that place. When she offers him a potato, he steals a piece of "black pudding" and he is caught immediately by the business owner, and when Carmen realizes he is attacking Angel, she intervenes on his behalf and eventually quits her job.

Thereafter, Angel apologizes for bad behavior, until she decides to forgive him, then explains what happened with the earthquake and his mother and insists to stay in her home; she finally believes him and agrees to give him shelter. On the other hand, the doctor realizes that Alicia suffers from amnesia, because she doesn't remember anything about her past life and she had forgotten her own name. The doctor decides to call her "Guadalupe".
 
Carmen knows the Angel's wish is to meet the pope personally, and she accompanies him to Bolivar's square and tells some of the places where he might go to get information regarding the Pope.

After unsuccessful attempts to establish contact with the Pope and in the midst of a difficult situation with Carmen unemployed, Angel read the newspaper and he noticed that they were looking for a performer to sing at the Pope's reception. Angel realizes that Carmen has a great aptitude for singing, and convinces her to answer this call. On the other hand, Alicia remembers little about her past and Carlos invites her to meet his mother, who cordially received at home. Meanwhile, Angel decides to ask for help from "Mr Fulgencio" to compose a song for the Pope, being precisely the singer Carmen. However, Carmen, was not entered formally in the competition, they were rejected. Despite the adversities, the parish Father which the contestants were presented, was that Carmen had a great talent and felt the song as the best of all, so that gave him the opportunity to perform. Time passed and Carmen did not receive the invitation to present that act, because the contest was rigged in favor of another singer. However, Angel decided to investigate and discovered that everything had been controlled, is with the Father and then apologizes for not coming, so does perform alongside Carmen "Mr Fulgencio" and she is chosen to sing on July 2, the very day the Pope arrives. When Carmen was ready to sing before thousands of people in the pavilion of Tunal park, Angel is prevented from entering, since only the singer could be near the Pope during the tribute. But ultimately, the child manages get in and goes up to the pavilion and he is received by the Pope, who gives him a kiss on the forehead and blesses him.

Carlos's mother turns on the TV just as the Pope's visit to Colombia is broadcast, so that Alicia sees her son and she begins to remember everything that happened.  At that moment she asks Carlos' help, and he manages to communicate with the singer. The film ends when Angel, eager after all this time, greets his mother by phone.

References

1987 films
Colombian drama films
Films set in Colombia